The Phoenix Throne (eojwa) is the term used to identify the throne of the hereditary monarchs of Korea. In an abstract sense, the Phoenix Throne also refers rhetorically to the head of state of the Joseon dynasty (1392–1897) and the Empire of Korea (1897–1910).

The phoenix motif  symbolizes the king's supreme authority.  The phoenix has a long association with Korean royalty — for example, in Goguryeo tomb murals like that of the Middle Gangseo Tumulus where the painted image of a phoenix is featured.

History

Enthronement ceremonies and the throne itself has evolved across the span of Korean history.  For example, from 1399 to 1549, seven of twelve kings were enthroned in the royal throne hall (Geunjeong-jeon) at Gyeongbokgung Palace. In other words, Jeongjong, Sejong, Danjong, Sejo, Seongjong, Jungjong, and Myeongjong ascended the Phoenix Throne in the same royal location.

Rhetorical usage
This flexible English term is also a rhetorical trope.  Depending on context, the Phoenix Throne can be construed as a metonymy, which is a rhetorical device for an allusion relying on proximity or correspondence, as for example referring to actions of the monarch or as "actions of the Phoenix Throne."

The Phoenix Throne is also understood as a synecdoche, which is related to metonymy and metaphor in suggesting a play on words by identifying a closely related conceptualization, e.g.,

 referring to the whole with the name of a part, such as "Phoenix Throne" for the serial symbols and ceremonies of enthronement
 " ... Yi Bang-won ... ascended the Phoenix Throne as King Taejong in 1400."
 "In 1776, Prince Sado's second son ascended the Phoenix Throne as King Jeongjo "
 
 referring to the general with the specific, such as "Phoenix Throne" for kingship—as in:
 "... T'aejo mounted the phoenix throne in Kaesǒng as the first ruler of Chosǒn."

See also

List of monarchs of Korea
Irworobongdo
 National emblem
Chrysanthemum Throne of the Emperors of Japan
The Lion Throne of Myanmar
Dragon Throne of the Emperors of China
Lion Throne of the Dalai Lama of Tibet
Naderi Throne in Iran
Peacock Throne of the Mughal Empire
Peacock Throne of the Persian Empire
Silver Throne - the Throne of Sweden
Throne of England and the Kings of England

Notes

References

 Henthorn, William E. (1971). A History of Korea. New York: Free Press. OCLC 186869329
 Korean Ministry of Culture and Information . (1978). A Handbook of Korea. Seoul: Korean Overseas Information Service, OCLC 6719067

External links 
   Gyeongbok Palace
  National Palace Museum of Korea
  Royal Palace

Korean monarchy
Thrones